Scott Fox is a pornographic film director who is a member of the AVN Hall of Fame.

Awards
 1992 AVN Award – Best Director, Video (The Cockateer)
 1995 AVN Hall of Fame inductee

References

American pornographic film directors
Living people
Year of birth missing (living people)
Place of birth missing (living people)